Sacco and Vanzetti is a 2001 opera by Anton Coppola.

Development 

Francis Ford Coppola recommended the idea of an opera based on Sacco and Vanzetti to his uncle Anton Coppola. It premiered at Opera Tampa in 2001. Coppola was the theater's conductor and founding artistic director between 1995 and 2012. Though it was not staged elsewhere, Coppola considered it his best work.

References

Further reading 

Eugene H. Cropsey, 'Sacco and Vanzetti: An American World Premiere', The Opera Quarterly, 2003 19(4):754-780, Oxford University Press.
 
 
 

2001 operas
Works about Sacco and Vanzetti
English-language operas
Operas set in the United States
Operas set in the 20th century
Operas